Auremir Evangelista dos Santos (10 September 1991) is a Brazilian professional footballer who plays for CRB. Mainly a defensive midfielder,  he can also play as a right back.

Honours

Club
Fortaleza
Campeonato Cearense: 2015

Cuiabá
Campeonato Mato-Grossense: 2021

Individual
 Campeonato Pernambucano Best Newcomer: 2011

References

External links

1991 births
Living people
Brazilian footballers
Association football defenders
Association football midfielders
Campeonato Brasileiro Série A players
Campeonato Brasileiro Série B players
Campeonato Brasileiro Série C players
Süper Lig players
Clube Náutico Capibaribe players
Botafogo Futebol Clube (PB) players
CR Vasco da Gama players
Paraná Clube players
Fortaleza Esporte Clube players
Sampaio Corrêa Futebol Clube players
Guarani FC players
Ceará Sporting Club players
Sivasspor footballers
Erzurumspor footballers
Cuiabá Esporte Clube players
Goiás Esporte Clube players
Brazilian expatriate footballers
Brazilian expatriate sportspeople in Turkey
Expatriate footballers in Turkey
Sportspeople from Recife